Gabrno is a settlement in the hills immediately east of Laško in east-central Slovenia. The area is part of the traditional region of Styria. It is now included with the rest of the municipality in the Savinja Statistical Region.

References

External links
Gabrno on Geopedia

Populated places in the Municipality of Laško